Kosoko is a Nigerian given name and surname. Notable people with the name include:
Kosoko (died 1872), a Nigerian monarch
Jide Kosoko (born 1954), Nigerian actor and descendant of Kosoko
Sola Kosoko (born 1976), Nigerian film actress and director, daughter of Jide
 Adekunle Gold (b. 1987), real name Adekunle Kosoko, Nigerian musician and descendant of Kosoko